The following is a list of films produced in the Kannada film industry in India in 1992, presented in alphabetical order.

References

External links
 http://www.bharatmovies.com/kannada/info/moviepages.htm
 http://www.kannadastore.com/

See also 

 Kannada films of 1991
 Kannada films of 1993

1992
Kannada
 Kan
1992 in Indian cinema